Lincs is an abbreviation for Lincolnshire, England. 

Lincs or LINCS may also refer to:

Linc's, an American television series from 1998 to 2000
Lincs Wind Farm, off the east coast of England
Lincs FM, a UK Independent Local Radio radio station serving Lincolnshire and Newark
Literacy Information and Communication System, an adult education program maintained by the Office of Career, Technical, and Adult Education
Laser Interconnect and Networking Communication System, LINCS A/B, two cubesats for laser communications tests

See also
Linc (disambiguation)
Links (disambiguation)